Tabira may refer to:

 Tabira, Nagasaki, Japan
 Tabira, Pernambuco, Brazil

See also
 Tavira (disambiguation)